KJKE (93.3 FM, "93.3 Jake FM") is a radio station broadcasting a new country music format. Licensed to Newcastle, Oklahoma, the station serves the Oklahoma City metropolitan area. The station is owned by Tyler Media. The station's studios are located in Northeast Oklahoma City and a transmitter site is located in Newcastle.

History

KTEN-FM began broadcasting in Ada, Oklahoma, on April 12, 1971. The station became KTLS in 1984 and was acquired by the Post-Newsweek Cable division of The Washington Post Company in 1990 as part of a package deal with Ada's cable system.

Tyler Media acquired the then-adult contemporary outlet in 1995. Tyler moved the station into the Oklahoma City market and relaunched it as KKNG-FM, "King Country", in late 1997.

On March 14, 2010, the station debuted its present branding, "93.3 Jake FM". The call letters were also changed to the current KJKE to reflect the new brand.

References

External links

FCC History Cards for KJKE

JKE